David Gamble may refer to:

Baronets
Sir David Gamble, 1st Baronet (1823–1907), of the Gamble baronets
Sir David Gamble, 3rd Baronet (1876–1943), of the Gamble baronets
Sir David Arthur Josias Gamble, 4th Baronet (1907–1982), of the Gamble baronets
Sir David Gamble, 5th Baronet (1933–1984), of the Gamble baronets
Sir David Hugh Norman Gamble, 6th Baronet (born 1966), of the Gamble baronets

Others
David Gamble (American football), American football wide receiver
David Gamble (photographer) (born 1953), British-American photographer and artist
David Gamble (film editor) (born 1955), British film editor
David Gamble, President of the Methodist Conference for 2009
David Gamble, Procter and Gamble executive who commissioned and lived in the Gamble House

See also
Gamble (disambiguation)